Walter Inglewood Smith (July 10, 1862 – January 27, 1922) was a United States representative from Iowa and a United States circuit judge of the United States Court of Appeals for the Eighth Circuit and the United States Circuit Courts for the Eighth Circuit.

Education and career

Born in Council Bluffs, Pottawattamie County, Iowa, Smith attended the common schools. He read law and was admitted to the bar in 1882 and practiced in Council Bluffs until 1890. He served as Judge of the fifteenth judicial district of Iowa from 1890 to 1900.

Congressional service

Smith was elected as a Republican to the 56th United States Congress to fill the vacancy caused by the resignation of United States Representative Smith McPherson and on the same day was elected to the 57th United States Congress. He was reelected to the 58th United States Congress and to the four succeeding Congresses and served from December 3, 1900, to March 15, 1911, when he resigned to accept an appointment on the bench.

Federal judicial service

Smith was nominated by President William Howard Taft on January 17, 1911, to a joint seat on the United States Court of Appeals for the Eighth Circuit and the United States Circuit Courts for the Eighth Circuit vacated by Judge Willis Van Devanter. He was confirmed by the United States Senate on January 31, 1911, and received his commission the same day.  On December 31, 1911, the Circuit Courts were abolished and he thereafter served only on the Court of Appeals. His service terminated on January 27, 1922, due to his death in Council Bluffs. He was interred in Fairview Cemetery in Council Bluffs.

References

Sources
 
 

1862 births
1922 deaths
Judges of the United States Court of Appeals for the Eighth Circuit
United States court of appeals judges appointed by William Howard Taft
20th-century American judges
Republican Party members of the United States House of Representatives from Iowa